This is a list of big beat artists, a genre that usually uses heavy breakbeats and synthesizer-generated loops and patterns. Big beat achieved mainstream success during the 1990s and early 2000s, but declined in popularity by 2001.

References

big beat